The Castlemaine Mail is a weekly newspaper published in Castlemaine, Victoria, Australia.

History 
The Castlemaine Mail continued the Mount Alexander Mail (also the Mail). It was published daily from 1 October 1917 until 14 November 1942, then tri-weekly until 13 July 1979, and later as a weekly, published on Tuesdays. Earlier newspapers in Castlemaine included the Castlemaine Yarner and Digger’s Gazette published on the goldfields in December 1853, and the daily Leader which ceased publication on 12 February 1916.

Castlemaine Mail covered the Mount Alexander Shire including Castlemaine, Maldon, Newstead and Metcalfe. Its office is at 29 Templeton Street, Castlemaine. Circulation in July 2008 was advertised as 3,250. It was merged with Guardian express to form the Midland Express (Kyneton, Victoria) but the masthead continues to be published every Friday as the Castlemaine Mail and circulated in Castlemaine and surrounds.

Digitisation 
The paper has been digitised as part of the Australian Newspapers Digitisation Program of the National Library of Australia.

See also 
 List of newspapers in Australia
 Midland Express

References

External links 
 Official Website

Newspapers published in Victoria (Australia)
Weekly newspapers published in Australia